The Toronto Rifles were a minor-league professional American football team active between 1964 and 1967. It was based in Toronto, Ontario. The team's home fields were Maple Leaf Stadium (1965) and Varsity Stadium from 1966 to 1967. The team was owned by Montreal businessman Johnny Newman.

As the Quebec Rifles, the team was the first professional American football team to be based in Canada. It played the 1964 season in Montreal, Quebec in the original United Football League. When the Continental Football League (COFL) was established for the 1965 season with former UFL teams, the Quebec Rifles were admitted and transferred to Toronto to become the Toronto Rifles due to the lack of a suitable facility in Montreal.  The Rifles competed in the Continental League from 1965–67, but the owners pulled out in the middle of their final season after having lost a reported $400,000 in their final full season. The league took over the club and planned to have it play all of its games on the road, but several weeks later the team folded after having played only four games.

The team finished second in the league in 1965, losing to the Charleston Rockets in the league championship. In 1967, however, the Canadian Football League's Toronto Argonauts signed away the Rifles' head coach, Leo Cahill, quarterback Tom Wilkinson and running back Joe Williams. Meanwhile, Alan Eagleson took over the franchise. The team declared bankruptcy four games into the 1967 season and the league folded the franchise at the same time as the Akron Vulcans.

The Rifles had a Canadian-based rival, the Montreal Beavers, when in the Continental Football League.

Seasons

Source: THE COFFIN CORNER: Vol. 10, No. 5 (1988) - The Continental Football League: A mini tragedy of five acts, Sarge Kennedy

Personnel

Players

 Allen Ray Aldridge LB 1966
 Charlie Baillie 1964 - with the Quebec Rifles
 Robert Blakley RB 1965-1966
 Phil Chiarella LB 1964 - with the Quebec R
 Bob Kreasul DE
 Ed Harrington, DE
 John Henry Jackson, QB
 Monte Kiffin, D
 Dick Limerick Flanker
 Rich Lucka Guard
 Leo Mavity Safety
 Bob Vokey punter, receiver and safety 1964 - with the Quebec Rifles, now a golf club craftsman
 Ernie Wade Tackle
 Tom Wilkinson QB 1966
 Joe Williams RB
Source: THE COFFIN CORNER: Vol. 10, No. 5 (1988) - The Continental Football League: A mini tragedy of five acts, Sarge Kennedy

Head coaches
 1964: Sam Etcheverry (former quarterback for the Montreal Alouettes and a member of the Canadian Football Hall of Fame; his nickname in his playing days was The Rifle)
 1965-1966: Leo Cahill (also GM; future CFL coach with the Toronto Argos)
 1967: Jackie Parker (former CFL player with the Toronto Argos and Edmonton Eskimos)

References

Rifles
Continental Football League teams
United Football League (1961–1964) teams
American football teams established in 1965
American football teams disestablished in 1967
1965 establishments in Ontario
1967 disestablishments in Ontario
Defunct Canadian football teams